The Lexikon zur Fotografie in Österreich 1839 bis 1945 first appeared in 2005 in the Vienna-based Albumverlag. The encyclopedia contains data on persons, institutions and companies, photo schools, associations and federations, cooperatives and guilds formerly and/or still active in Austria as well as photo exhibitions, newspapers and magazines for the period from the invention of photography in 1839 until the end of the Second World War in 1945.

References

External links 
 Content of the Lexikon
 Review on www.falter.at

Mass media in Vienna
Encyclopedias of art
History of photography
Biographical dictionaries